The climate in most parts of Azerbaijan is semi-arid. In order to expand the areas of irrigation in a dry climate and to provide grape and orchards with water, many small and large reservoirs (reservoirs, water intakes, water tanks) have been created. There are 140 reservoirs in the country. The total volume of reservoirs is 21.5 km3. Most reservoirs are regulated and used for irrigation. Reservoirs and hydroelectric stations created in the rivers Kura, Araz and Tartar are Shamkir, Mingachevir, Yenikend, Varvara, Araz and Sarsang. They are used to ensure the use of energy, irrigation and water supply.

Largest reservoirs

Mingachevir reservoir 
The largest reservoir of the republic is Mingachevir. It was commissioned in 1953.

The area is 605 km2, the volume is 16.1 km3, the length is 70 km, the greatest width is 18 km, the average depth is 27 m, the largest is 75 m. The altitude is 83 m. The purpose of its creation was the development of energy, agriculture, water transport, multi-year flow regulation and the liquidation of floods in the course of the river.

Shamkir reservoir 
The Shamkir reservoir was built on the Shamkir section of the Kura River in 1982. The area of the Shamkir reservoir is 116 km2. The total volume of the reservoir is 2,677 million m3, and the operating volume of water is 1425 million m3. It is the second largest reservoir in the Caucasus after the Mingachevir reservoir. The normal water level in the tank is 158 m, and the surface area is 115 km2.

Yenikend reservoir 
The Yenikend reservoir is a large reservoir in the Shamkir district. It is the third largest reservoir in the Caucasus after the Mingachevir and Shamkir reservoirs. The total area is 23.2 km2, the water volume in the reservoir is 158 million m3.

Varvara reservoir 
The Varvara reservoir is located 20 km to the south of the Mingachevir reservoir. It was built in 1952. The total area is 22.5 km2, and the reservoir volume is 0.06 km3

Sarsang reservoir 
The Sarsang reservoir was built in Azerbaijan in 1976 on the Tartar River, in the former Agdara, in the present Terter district.

The reservoir has the highest dam of all the dams in Azerbaijan. Since the opening, the reservoir has provided irrigation water for 100,000 hectares of agricultural land in the areas of Tartar, Agdam, Barda, Goranboy, Yevlakh and Aghjabadi.

Agstafachay reservoir 
The Agstafacay reservoir is a large reservoir in the Agstafa region of northwestern Azerbaijan. The Agstafacay reservoir was built on the Agstafa river in 1969 near the village of Jafarli in the Qazakh district. The reservoir area is 6.3 km2. The total volume of the reservoir is 120 million m3. The height of the hydroelectric plant built on the reservoir is 52 m. The reservoir provides irrigation water up to 135 hectares of land in the Qazakh, Shamkir and Tovuz regions.

Jeyranbatan reservoir 
Jeyranbatan is a reservoir in the Absheron region in the eastern part of Azerbaijan. It is located between the cities of Baku and Sumgayit, near the settlement of Jeyranbatan, 20 km from Baku. It was built in 1958 to provide drinking water to the growing population of Baku and Sumgayit. The total area is 13.9 km2, the reservoir volume is 186 million m3, 150 million m3used. The length of the reservoir is 8.74 km, the maximum width is 2.15 km, the length of the coastline is 23.3 km. The maximum depth of water in the tank is 28.5 m.

Zogalavanchay reservoir 
The Zohalavanchay reservoir is located on the Zogalavanchay Canyon in the southwestern part of the Shamakhi district of the Republic of Azerbaijan. The reservoir was commissioned in 1973 to meet the drinking water needs of wineries and settlements. Due to financial difficulties in the 1990s, the work of the reservoir was not properly performed, and the facilities were in poor condition. Some of the mechanical and electrical equipment was destroyed, and some of them were technically obsolete. In accordance with the order of the Cabinet of Ministers in 2007, the Azerbaijan Melioration and Water Management Company of the Republic of Azerbaijan initiated the repair of the Zogalavanchay Reservoir. In 2012, the tank was renovated in accordance with modern requirements. The height of the dam is 26 m, the length is 560 m, the total water tank is 3.8 million m3.

Other reservoirs

Khachinchay 
Reservoir on Khachinchay river was built in 1964. The volume of the reservoir is 23 million  m3. Absolute height is 507 m, the surface area is 1.76 km2.

Ganligol 
The reservoir located at the highest altitude is located in Garabagh. This reservoir was built in 1965 year. Its volume is 1.0 million m3, the surface area is 0.1 km2, the absolute height is 242.0 m.

Arpachay 
The reservoir Arpachay was built in 1977 on the river of the same name. The source is the river Arpachay. Its volume is 150.0 million m3, the surface area is 6.3 km2, the absolute height is 955 m.

Agdamkend 
The Agdamkend reservoir was built in 1962 on the Gargar River. Its volume is 1.6 million m3, the surface area is 0.5 km2, the absolute height is 291.5 m.

See also 
 Rivers of Azerbaijan

References 

Reservoirs in Azerbaijan
Lists of dams and reservoirs by country